Justin Moed is a Democratic member of the Indiana House of Representatives, representing the 97th district since 2013.

Moed earned his bachelor's degree from Butler University, then worked as doorkeeper for the Indiana House of Representatives. He worked up to senior policy analyst, then decided to run for office.

Early life and education 
Moed graduated from Butler University in Indianapolis in 2006.

Legislative career
Justin Moed serves as the Democratic Whip in the Indiana House of Representatives. He is the ranking minority member of the Public Policy Committee. Moed is a member of the Agriculture and Rural Development committee, as well as the Local Government committee.

Justin Moed has served as the representative for the citizens of Indiana's 97th district since 2013. Democrats have been in the minority for the duration of his time in office, so Moed had to work across party lines to deliver results for his constituents.

Key Votes 
On August 5, 2022, Moed voted against SB1, which Prohibits All Abortions Unless Under Certain Circumstances. The bill passed the House 62-38. Governor Eric Holcomb signed the bill into law on August 5, 2022.

On April 24, 2019, Moed voted to Authorize Sports Betting for the State of Indiana (HB 1015).

On January 13, 2016, Moed Co-Sponsored the bill to Repeal ISTEP Program for Indiana public schools (HB 1395).

On February 27, 2014, Moed voted to repeal Common Core Standards for Indiana public schools.

On February 25, 2014, Moed voted to Authorize the Sale of Alcohol at the Indiana State Fair (SB 339).

Civil Liberties 
On January 26, 2022, Moed voted against HB 1134, which Prohibits Teaching Certain Concepts on Race, Gender, and Ethnicity.

On February 22, 2021, Moed voted against HB 1369, a bill to Authorize Carrying a Firearm Without Permit.

On March 7, 2016, Moed voted to Authorize Liquor Licenses for State Parks (HB 1386).

On January 28, 2014, Moed voted against HJR 3, a joint resolution which Defines Marriage as Between 1 Man and 1 Woman.

On February 25, 2013, Moed voted to Require Drug Testing for Certain Welfare Recipients (HB 1483).

Criminal Justice 
On February 22, 2021, Moed voted to Establish a Defense for a Person who Operates a Vehicle with Marijuana in Their Metabolism (HB 1028).

On January 7, 2021, Moed Co-Sponsored HB 1006, a bill to increase Police Accountability.

On April 22, 2019, Moed voted to Expand "Stand Your Ground" Laws (HB 1284).

On February 14, 2019, Moed voted to Increase Penalties for Animal Abuse (HB 1615).

On January 26, 2016, Moed voted against HB 1019, a bill that Limits Public Access to Police Body Camera Footage.

Education 
On May 24, 2022, Moed voted against HB 1041, a bill to Prohibit Transgender Girls from Playing on Female Sports Teams.

On March 11, 2020, Moed voted against HB 1065, a bill that Authorizes School Districts to Use Tax Dollars for Charter Schools.

On April 2, 2019, Moed voted to Authorize Academic Credit for Religious Education Courses (SB 373).

On February 18, 2019, Moed voted to Authorize Firearm Training for Teachers and School Staff (HB 1253).

On January 7, 2014, Moed Co-Sponsored HB 1004, a bill that Establishes Preschool Scholarship System for Certain Individuals.

On April 15, 2013, Moed voted to Authorize Certain Undocumented Students to Receive In-State Tuition (SB 207).

Election Integrity 
On January 31, 2022, Moed voted against HB 1116, a bill to Increase Requirements for Mail-In Voting.

Environment 
On January 14, 2021, Moed Co-Sponsored HB 1381, a bill to Establish Standards for Assessing Solar Projects.

On March 3, 2020, Moed voted against SB 229, a bill to Remove State Oversight of Certain Drains near Wetlands.

On January 28, 2014, Moed voted against HB 1143, a bill that Prohibits State Environmental Regulations from Exceeding EPA Regulations.

Healthcare 
On August 5, 2022, Moed voted to Appropriate Funds for Pregnancy and Child Care (SB 2).

On May 10, 2021, Moed voted against SB 5, a bill that Prohibits a Local Health Department from Implementing Orders More Restrictive than the Governor.

On March 11, 2020, Moed voted to Require Healthcare Providers Give "Good Faith" Estimates of Medical Costs.

On January 23, 2018, Moed voted to Require Dissemination of Vaccine Information.

Transportation 
On March 13, 2014, Moed voted to Authorize Funding for a Mass Transit System (SB 176).

On February 25, 2013, Moed voted to Authorize a Metropolitan Transit District for the City of Indianapolis.

Electoral history

2022 
Incumbent Justin Moed (D) will face John Schmitz (R) and Edgar Amaro Villegas (L) in the general election for Indiana House of Representatives District 97 on Tuesday, November 8, 2022.

2020 
Justin Moed defeated John Schmitz (R) and Mark Renholzberger (L) in the 2020 general election.

Indiana House of Representatives, District 97, General Election

Justin Moed (D)          55.5% (9,707 votes)

John Schmitz (R)        39.8% (6,962 votes)

Mark Renholzberger (L) 4.7% (816 votes)

2018 
Incumbent Justin Moed (D) was unchallenged in the Democratic primary and in the general election.

Indiana House of Representatives, District 97, General Election

Justin Moed (D)          100% (8,635 votes)

2016 
Indiana House of Representatives, District 97, General Election

Justin Moed (D)          60.95% (9,834 votes)

Dale Nye (R)               39.05% (6,300 votes)

2014 
Incumbent Justin Moed (D) was unchallenged in the Democratic primary and in the general election.

Indiana House of Representatives, District 97, General Election

Justin Moed (D)          100%

2012 
Indiana House of Representatives, District 97, General Election

Justin Moed (D)          58.3% (8,325 votes)

AJ Feeney-Ruiz (R)    41.7% (5,961 votes)

Personal life

Justin Moed graduated from Butler University in 2006. He started as a doorkeeper for the Indiana House of Representatives, then was Assistant Policy Director, and later served as Senior Policy Analyst.

Moed is a homeowner in Garfield Park, where he owns and manages an urban farm. He is also involved with numerous neighborhood organizations. Moed serves as a member of the Indiana State Tourism Council, the White River Park Commission, and on the Board of Advisors for Indiana University - Indianapolis.

In March 2015, Moed was caught in a sexting scandal with adult film actress Sydney Leathers. Moed sent Leathers money and a series of gifts, and revealed a series of explicit fantasies and stories of his own sexual history. Leathers herself first became famous for her sexting affair with former Congressman Anthony Weiner. Moed later apologized.

References

External links
Official Legislative website
 
Twitter account

Living people
Democratic Party members of the Indiana House of Representatives
Butler University alumni
21st-century American politicians
Year of birth missing (living people)